Samuel Brown (26 February 1857 – 5 September 1938) was an English first-class cricketer active 1884–97 who played for Nottinghamshire. He was born in Kimberley, Nottinghamshire; died in Edgeley near Stockport, Cheshire, aged 81.  

He played below first-class level for Shropshire in three matches in 1882-83, and for Cheshire while club professional at Stockport.

References

1857 births
1938 deaths
English cricketers
Nottinghamshire cricketers
People from Kimberley, Nottinghamshire
Cricketers from Nottinghamshire
North v South cricketers
Cheshire cricketers